Lahawarthakari  is a village development committee in Parsa District in the Narayani Zone of southern Nepal. At the time of the 2011 Nepal census it had a population of 4,038 people living in 523 individual households. There were 2,129 males and 1,909 females at the time of census.

References

Populated places in Parsa District